Jhunjhunu is a city having and capital of Jhunjhunu district in the state of Rajasthan.  This city is in the northern state of Rajasthan, India and the administrative headquarters of Jhunjhunu District. Jhunjhunu has given highest number of soldiers to India.

History
Jhunjhunu is a very old and historical town. .

Demographics

In the 2011 India census, the town of Jhunjhunu had a population of 118,473 and a literacy rate of 73.58%.

Transport

Rail
 comes within the territory of the North Western Railway. Jhunjhunu city is connected through a broadgauge line to Sikar, Rewari, and Delhi. Railway Minister Suresh Prabhu flagged off two trains to mark the completion of Rs. 260 crore gauge conversion of the 122 km Loharu-Sikar railway line in Rajasthan.  Both trains were flagged off by Prabhu through remote control by organising video conferencing between Rail Bhawan, New Delhi and Sikar, Rajasthan. Prabhu pointed out that sufficient funds have been provided in 2015–16 to complete this project, i.e., Jaipur-Ringas-Churu, by March, 2017. Rail service between Jhunjhunu and Delhi (14811/14812) Delhi Sarai Rohilla-Sikar Express (bi-weekly) began 2 September 2015.

Road
SH 8 proceeds from Jhunjhunu town to Sikar and connects to NH 52 in Sikar (Gokulpura) but direct way from Jhunjhunu town to Jaipur is via Udaipurwati, Sri Madhopur, Reengus this Super State Highway proceeds from Pilani to Reengus(Sri Madhopur tehsil) via Chirawa, Jhunjhunu, Udaipurwati and Sri Madhopur main city.

Air
The nearest airport to Jhunjhunu city is Jaipur International Airport.

See also
 Jhunjhunwala
 Tibrewal

References

 
Cities and towns in Jhunjhunu district
Shekhawati
Thar Desert